Bethpage is an unincorporated community and census-designated place (CDP) in Sumner County, Tennessee, United States. It is located along U.S. Route 31E, northeast of neighboring Gallatin. As of the 2010 census, its population was 288. The area has its own Post Office. The United States Postal Service ZIP code for the Bethpage area is 37022.

Demographics

Climate
<div style="width:70%;">

References

Census-designated places in Tennessee
Census-designated places in Sumner County, Tennessee
Unincorporated communities in Tennessee
Unincorporated communities in Sumner County, Tennessee